The U-class was a class of ten trams built by Duncan & Fraser, Adelaide from JG Brill Company kits for the North Melbourne Electric Tramway & Lighting Company (NMET) as numbers 1-10.  All passed to the Melbourne & Metropolitan Tramways Board on 1 August 1922 when it took over the NMET becoming the U-class and renumbered 202-211.

References

Melbourne tram vehicles
600 V DC multiple units